Tim Wilkison defeated Russell Simpson 6–4, 6–4, 6–4 to win the 1982 Heineken Open singles competition. Bill Scanlon was the champion but did not defend his title.

Seeds
A champion seed is indicated in bold text while text in italics indicates the round in which that seed was eliminated.

  Chris Lewis (quarterfinals)
  Tim Wilkison (champion)
  Steve Krulevitz (first round)
  David Carter (second round)
  Richard Lewis (second round)
  Robert Van't Hof (semifinals)
  Martin Davis (second round)
  Russell Simpson (final)

Draw
 NB: The Final was the best of 5 sets while all other rounds were the best of 3 sets.

Final

Section 1

Section 2

External links
 Association of Tennis Professional (ATP) – 1982 Men's Singles draw

ATP Auckland Open
1982 Grand Prix (tennis)